Pristimantis pecki is a species of frog in the family Strabomantidae.
It is found in Ecuador and Peru.
Its natural habitat is tropical moist montane forests.
It is threatened by habitat loss.

References

pecki
Amphibians of Ecuador
Amphibians of Peru
Amphibians described in 1988
Taxonomy articles created by Polbot